Matthew Breen is an American journalist and editor living in New York, NY, United States. He is the editorial director at Logo. He was previously the editor-in-chief  of The Advocate, a national LGBT news magazine, and deputy editor at Out. He was previously a freelance film critic, and the program director for the 2001 Austin Film Festival, and an associate film programmer for the 2002 IFP/West Los Angeles Film Festival, and media manager for the 1998 and 1999 Sundance Film Festivals.

Breen's petition demanding the pardon of the approximately 49,000 men convicted of "gross indecency" laws in the United Kingdom gathered nearly 500,000 signatures. U.K. campaigners and the relatives of Alan Turing delivered 10 Downing Street in 2015. The Alan Turing Law was enacted in 2017.

References

External links
RealScreen.com People on the Move
The Advocate’s Matthew Breen Headed to Brooklyn
The editor of The Advocate talks about the magazine returning to newsstands and the big gay news stories of 2013.
Matthew Breen Named Editor of The Advocate
Journalist Q&A | PR Week

American male journalists
American editors
Living people
Year of birth missing (living people)
Place of birth missing (living people)
Film festival directors
Journalists from New York City